Zheng Saisai was the defending champion but lost in the final to Irina Khromacheva 3–6, 6–4, 7–6(7–5).

Seeds

Draw

Finals

Top half

Bottom half

Qualifying

Seeds

Qualifiers

Qualifying draw

First qualifier

Second qualifier

Third qualifier

Fourth qualifier

References
Main Draw
Qualifying Draw

Kunming Open - Singles